Black Magic is a 1987 Filipino fantasy comedy film directed by Mike Relon Makiling. The film stars Dolphy, Zsa Zsa Padilla, Jestoni Alarcon, Rita Avila, Ian Veneracion, Michael Locsin, Rose Ann Gonzales Jovit Moya, Jennifer Sevilla, and Jaime Castillo. Produced by Seiko Films, it was released on November 26, 1987.

Critic Luciano E. Soriano of the Manila Standard gave the film a mixed review, praising Dolphy's natural comedic skills while criticizing the number of characters as excessive and unnecessary for the story.

Cast

Dolphy as Demi, a janitor
Zsa Zsa Padilla as Valerie, a teacher
Jestoni Alarcon as Victor Bulaklak
Rita Avila as Emma
Ian Veneracion
Michael Locsin as Albert
Rose Ann Gonzales
Jovit Moya
Jennifer Sevilla
Jaime Castillo
Romy Diaz as Satanas
Jimmy Santos as Brian
Johnny Wilson
Don Pepot
Ros Olgado
Lucita Soriano as a prostitute
Joaquin Fajardo
Conde Ubaldo
Fred Moro
Balot
Mely Tagasa
Larry Silva
Rusty Santos
Vangie Labalan
Flora Gasser
Pong Pong
Rod Francisco
Jay Grama
Julie del Mar
Nesty Ramirez
Arthur Lioron
Emeng Barcelona
Jay-R Balanche

Release
Black Magic was released on November 26, 1987.

Box office
On its opening day, the film grossed ₱1.8 million, behind Kapag Puno Na ang Salop starring Fernando Poe Jr. and ahead of Walang Karugtong ang Nakaraan starring Sharon Cuneta. However, Black Magic would later become the highest-grossing film among the three releases.

Critical response
Luciano E. Soriano of the Manila Standard gave Black Magic a mixed review. He praised Dolphy's dependable comedic skills, stating that he plays his character "with the ease of one who has been there for a long time", while criticizing the film's excessive number of characters, as its lead to a script that "meanders here and there to justify the presence of too many characters in the story." He also noted the film's strange inclusion of sexual innuendos in what is supposed to be a film meant for young viewers.

References

External links

1987 films
1980s fantasy comedy films
Filipino-language films
Philippine fantasy comedy films
Seiko Films films
Films directed by Mike Relon Makiling